Harmony Lessons (Aslannyń sabaqtary) is a 2013 Kazakh-German drama film directed by Emir Baigazin. It was awarded a Silver Bear for outstanding artistic contribution for camera work at the Berlinale in 2013.

Plot
Harmony Lessons is set in a small Kazakhstan village, where Aslan, a thirteen-year-old boy living with his grandmother is a diligent student, bullied by an older boy Bolat and his gang connected with adult criminals and prisoners. The plot concerns Aslan's humiliations, and slow revenge.

Cast
The cast includes:
 Timur Aidarbekov as Aslan
 Aslan Anarbayev as Bolat
 Mukhtar Andassov as Mirsain
 Anelya Adilbekova as Akzhan
 Omar Adilov as Mad
 Adlet Anarbekov as Takhir
 Daulet Anarbekov as Damir
 Nursultan Nurbergenov as Maksat
 Nurdaulet Orazymbetov as Daniyar
 Erasyl Nurzhakyp as Arsen
 Assan Kirkabakov as Shikan
 Ramazan Sultanbek as Gani

Production
Harmony Lessons won the World Cinema Fund Prize in January 2013, becoming first Kazakhstan’s project to be supported by the Fund.

Release
The film premiered in competition at the 63rd Berlin International Film Festival in 2013 where Aziz Zhambakiyev was awarded for a Silver Bear for  outstanding artistic contribution for camera work.

The film was also screened at the Tribeca Film Festival in New York City.

Baygazin was nominated for the Asia Pacific Screen Award for Achievement in Directing for Harmony Lessons.

References

External links
 

2013 films
2013 drama films
German drama films
Kazakhstani drama films
Kazakh-language films
Films directed by Emir Baigazin
Silver Bear for outstanding artistic contribution
Films about bullying
Films about school violence
2010s German films